Killylea is a small village and townland in Northern Ireland.  It is within the Armagh City and District Council area. The village is set on a hill, with St Mark's Church of Ireland, built in 1832, at its summit.  The village lies to the west of County Armagh, and is close to the neighbouring counties of County Tyrone and County Monaghan which is in the Republic of Ireland. It had a population of 253 people in the 2011 Census.

Spelling 
Many people have difficulty spelling Killylea, often confusing it with the County Down village of Killyleagh. An easy way to remember is the acronym K I L L Y L E A, standing for Kathryn Is Lovely Like Yellow Leaves Every Autumn.

History
In 1858 Killylea railway station opened, situated on the Elm Park Road.  It was opened by the Ulster Railway and became part of the Great Northern Railway in 1876, offering people the chance to travel to Belfast and Dublin. Like most rural railways in Northern Ireland, it was not to last and eventually closed in 1957.  The station platforms can still be seen today from the railway bridge on the Elm Park Road.

In September 1887 events on the platform of Killylea railway station made it into the British House of Commons as Alexander Blane, Nationalist MP for South Armagh asked a question relating to an attack on a train by what he described as an "Orange mob". Edward King-Harman, then Under-Secretary for Ireland, stated "that a party of Nationalists returning by train from a meeting at Middle-town, County Armagh, while passing Killylea Station, which is essentially an Orange district, made use of party cries" and that the only shot fired was from the train, concluding that "Nationalists appear to have been altogether responsible" for the events.  He goes on to say that a "boy" was injured by the shot fired from the train but that he escaped with only minor injuries to his foot.

From 1920 to 1954 Killylea was home to an elite private school, Elm Park Preparatory School.  This was set up by Seth Smith and Willoughby Weaving to educate boys up to the age of 14. Following the outbreak of World War II, the school's population expanded dramatically because parents believed that it was safer than sending their children to England. This expansion, however, was not to last and due to a decline in numbers in the years following World War II, the school was forced to close in 1954.  One of the most famous pupils to attend Elm Park school was Brian Faulkner who was to become the sixth and final Prime Minister of Northern Ireland, presiding over the prorogation of the Stormont Parliament in 1972 following the outbreak of the Troubles only a few years earlier.  Faulkner attended the school from 1933 to 1935.  There is still a pew in St. Mark's Church which bears the name of the school as it is where the boys sat when they attended church each Sunday.

As is illustrated by the name of the pub at the top of Main Street, Killylea has always been closely associated with hunting, with the traditional Boxing Day hunt taking place in December each year.  This tradition stretches back to 1838 when the Tynan and Armagh Harriers were established by Sir James Stronge.

Demography

2011 Census
In the 2011 Census Killylea had a population of 253 people (107 households).

2001 Census
In the 2001 Census the village and some of the surrounding area including, Fellow's Hall, Aughrafin and Elm Park, had a population of 351 people.  Of these, 9.1% said that they were from the Catholic community and 89.5% of the population declared that they had a 'Protestant or other' community background.

Railways
The Ulster Railway opened Killylea railway station on 25 May 1858. In 1876 the Ulster Railway was merged with other railway companies to form the Great Northern Railway (Ireland).  The line and station were closed on 14 October 1957.

Transport
Killylea is situated just off the A28, Aughnacloy to Newry road.  Five miles to the east, this leads to the city of Armagh, and beyond to the south-west towards Newry.  To the west, the A28 leads towards Aughnacloy and, beyond, towards Omagh and Enniskillen.

Further afield, Killylea is also served by the M1 motorway which can be accessed twelve miles to the north, near Dungannon or, alternatively, near Portadown which is fifteen miles to the north-east.

Education
Killylea Primary School caters for around 80 children between the ages of 4 and 11 from the village of Killylea and the surrounding area. An award-winning Eco school it serves the local and wider community. Breakfast Club at 8am, Stay Late 2-3pm and Chatterbox 3-4pm support working parents. Check out school website www.killyleaps.com or Killylea Primary on Facebook.

Nightlife
Killylea is locally known as the 'village that never sleeps' and is a hive of constant activity, mainly centred on The Huntsman Inn. Other hotspots include Digby's Bar and Restaurant and Jimmy's Shebeen.

Killylea proverbs
"Once you break the head off your Orange Lily, you can't put it back on again". 
This proverb means that people should be careful not to do things that they may later regret because, very often, they cannot be undone.

"When the crows are flying backwards, its time to bring your washing in"
Being at the top of a hill Killylea is a windy place with large gusts being very common.

Religion
There are two places of worship in Killylea.  At the summit of Killylea's hill is the oldest of the two churches, St. Mark's Church of Ireland.  At the bottom of the hill is Killylea Methodist Church.

Sport
Killylea is home to a lawn bowls club who regularly compete in leagues in Armagh.

Although football is a popular sport in Killylea, the village does not have its own team. A team representing the village used to compete in local leagues under the name of Killylea Swifts Football Club.

Culture
The Orange Order has a strong presence in the village and district with 11 lodges in the surrounding area and two in the village itself.  Numerous marching bands also exist in the area.  Most notable amongst these would be Cormeen Rising Sons of William Flute Band, Killylea Silver Band, the Crozier Memorial Pipe Band and Ballyrea Boyne Defenders Flute Band.

Two of the largest band parades in Northern Ireland's parading calendar are hosted in Killylea.  Cormeen host their parade on St. Patrick's Day every year and Ballyrea hold a Battle of the Somme commemoration parade every year on 1 July.  In 2012 Cormeen's parade was, for the first time, held in Armagh City.

People
Although born in Belfast, one of Killylea's most famous residents was John Luke.  Luke is, perhaps, most famous for painting the dome of Belfast City Hall.  He moved to Killylea in 1941 in order to escape the dangers of living in Belfast during World War II and lived there until his death in 1975.

Barry Close, officer in the East India Company army, was born at Elm Park, near Killylea.

See also 

 List of towns and villages in Northern Ireland

References 

 Culture Northern Ireland

External links
 Massacre at Corr Bridge, near Killylea, 1641

Villages in County Armagh
Townlands of County Armagh
Civil parish of Tynan